HNoMS  Svenner was a Royal Norwegian Navy destroyer during the Second World War. She was built for the Royal Navy as the S-class destroyer HMS Shark but on completion was lent to the Norwegian Armed Forces in exile. Svenner was sunk off Sword, one of the Allied landing zones in Normandy, at dawn on 6 June 1944 while supporting the British Army Normandy landings.

Description
She was powered by two Parsons geared steam turbines, each driving one propeller shaft, using steam provided by two Admiralty three-drum boilers. Her complement was 170 officers and ratings.

The ship was armed with four 45-calibre 4.7-inch (120 mm) Mark XII guns in dual-purpose mounts. For anti-aircraft (AA) defence, Svenner had one twin mount for Bofors 40 mm guns and four twin  Oerlikon autocannon. She was fitted with two above-water quadruple mounts for  torpedoes. Two depth charge rails and four throwers were fitted for which 70 depth charges were provided.

Construction and career
The ship was launched on 1 June 1943 as the Royal Navy ship HMS Shark (G03), but was rechristened HNoMS Svenner when she was commissioned in the Royal Norwegian Navy in 1944. Svenner was the only Allied ship to be sunk by German naval activity on the morning of 6 June. She was struck amidships, exploded, broke in two and sank very quickly. Casualties were 1 British and 32 Norwegian crewmen killed, and 185 (15 wounded) rescued from the crew of 219. 
The anchor from Svenner was recovered in 2003, and now forms 'The Svenner Memorial' at Sword. The memorial can be found approximately 100 yards on the sea-side of the coast road at Hermanville-sur-Mer, Normandy, France.

References

Bibliography
 
 
 
 
 
 

 

S and T-class destroyers
Ships built on the River Clyde
1943 ships
World War II destroyers of the United Kingdom
S-class destroyers of the Royal Norwegian Navy
World War II destroyers of Norway
World War II shipwrecks in the English Channel
Maritime incidents in June 1944